Michael Pate OAM (born Edward John Pate; 26 February 1920 – 1 September 2008) was an Australian actor, writer, director, and producer, who also worked prolifically as a supporting actor in Hollywood films and American Television during the 1950s and 1960s.

Biography

Early life
Pate was born in Drummoyne, New South Wales, and attended Fort Street High School. Initially interested in becoming a medical missionary, but unable to afford the university fees due to the Depression, he worked in Sydney before 1938, when he became a writer and broadcaster for the Australian Broadcasting Commission, collaborating with George Ivan Smith on Youth Speaks. For the remainder of the 1930s, he worked primarily in radio drama. He also published theatrical and literary criticism and enjoyed brief success as an author of short stories, publishing works in both Australia and the United States.

World War II
During World War II, Pate served in the Australian Army in the South West Pacific Area. He was transferred to the 1st Australian Army Amenities Entertainment Unit, known as "The Islanders", entertaining Australian troops in various combat areas.

Australian acting career
After the war, Pate returned to radio, appearing in many plays and serials. Between 1946 and 1950 he began working in films. In 1949 he appeared in his first leading role in Sons of Matthew. In 1950, he appeared in Bitter Springs with Tommy Trinder and Chips Rafferty.  That same year Pate also adapted, produced, and directed two plays: Dark of the Moon and Bonaventure.

Hollywood, 1950s–1960s
Later in 1950 he travelled to the United States to appear in a film adaptation of Bonaventure for Universal Pictures, which was released in 1951 as Thunder on the Hill, starring Claudette Colbert and Ann Blyth.  Pate spent most of the remainder of the 1950s in the United States, appearing in over 300 television shows and films. Most notable among those was a 1954 Climax! live production of Ian Fleming's Casino Royale, in which Pate played the role of "Clarence Leiter", opposite Barry Nelson's "Jimmy Bond". On the big screen, he played the one-scene role of Flavius in Julius Caesar, the 1953 film adaptation of William Shakespeare's play. In the same year he played for the first time the Apache chief Victorio, a role he would reprise several times in his career, in Australian director John Farrow's western Hondo playing opposite John Wayne.   Pate later said that this was his favourite film role.  He also went on to perform many Native American roles in movies and on television. In 1956 he appeared in the film The Court Jester, and three years later he played the lead role of a gunfighting vampire in the horror film Curse of the Undead. He played parts as well in episodes 27 and 28 of the 1957 television series Zorro along with Guy Williams.  Pate in 1963 played the role of Puma, the Comanche chief in Andrew V. McLaglen's western McLintock!, again playing opposite John Wayne.

During his time in the United States, Pate became an acting instructor and lecturer, and wrote many screenplays and plays for American films and television series, including Rawhide ("Incident of the Power and the Plow" with Dick Van Patten) and Most Dangerous Man Alive ("The Steel Monster"). In 1959, he returned briefly to Australia, where he starred in a television presentation of Tragedy in a Temporary Town, shown as part of the Shell Presents anthology drama series. After that project he returned to the United States for another eight years, during which time he enjoyed a successful career as a television character actor, appearing repeatedly on programs such as Gunsmoke, Sugarfoot, The Texan, The Rifleman, Maverick (S4 Ep23),Branded ("Call to Glory"), Daniel Boone, The Virginian, Perry Mason ("The Case of the Skeleton's Closet" and "The Case of the Wednesday Woman"), Batman (episodes 45 "The Clock King's Crazy Crimes" and 46 "The Clock King Gets Crowned"), Mission: Impossible ("Trek"), The Man from U.N.C.L.E. ("The Foreign Legion Affair"), Get Smart, Rawhide ("Incident of the Power and the Plow", "Incident at Superstition Prairie", "Incident of the Boomerang", and others), Voyage to the Bottom of the Sea ("The Traitor"), and Wagon Train. In the 1963 movie PT 109, he played the part of Arthur Reginald Evans, the Australian coast watcher who helped rescue John F. Kennedy and his crew.  That role was of the few occasions when Pate played an Australian while working in the United States, others including Four Star Playhouse ("The Firing Squad"), 77 Sunset Strip ("The Down-Under Caper"), and Rawhide ("Incident of the Boomerang", for which he also wrote the story-line).

Return to Australia, 1968
In 1968, Pate returned to Australia and became a television producer, winning two Logie Awards while working at the Seven Network. In 1970, he published a textbook on acting, The Film Actor. From 1971 to 1975 he starred as Detective Senior Sergeant Vic Maddern in Matlock Police.  After leaving Matlock Police, Pate began working more behind the camera, continuing to work too in theatre in both Sydney and Melbourne.  In 1977 he wrote and produced The Mango Tree, starring his son Christopher Pate.  In 1979 he adapted the screenplay for Tim from the novel by Colleen McCullough, as well as producing and directing the film, which starred Piper Laurie and Mel Gibson. Pate won the Best Screenplay Award from the Australian Writers Guild for his adaptation.

His film appearances in the 1970s and 1980s included Mad Dog Morgan (1976), introduction in the biopic The Battle of Broken Hill (1981), Duet for Four (1982), The Wild Duck (1984), Death of a Soldier (1986), and Howling III (1987). Pate also appeared as the President of the United States in The Return of Captain Invincible (1982), in which he sings "What the World Needs", a song calling for the return of Captain Invincible to save the world.  During the early 1980s Pate also collaborated with his son Christopher in a successful stage production of Mass Appeal at the Sydney Opera House.

Personal life
In 1951, Pate married Felippa Rock, daughter of American film producer Joe Rock.  The couple had a son, Christopher Pate, also an actor, along with a number of grandchildren and great-grandchildren.

Although Michael Pate retired from acting in 2001, he remained busy with voiceover work; and he was writing a screenplay at the time of his death.  He died at the age of 88 at Gosford Hospital in New South Wales, Australia, on 1 September 2008.

Partial filmography

 Forty Thousand Horsemen (1940) as Arab Carpet Seller / Arab Customer / Sikh Policeman (uncredited)
 Sons of Matthew (1949) as Shane O'Riordan
 Bitter Springs (1950) as Trooper
 Thunder on the Hill (1951) as Willie (also screenplay)
 Ten Tall Men (1951) as Browning
 The Strange Door (1951) as Talon
 5 Fingers (1952) as Morrison (uncredited)
 Face to Face (Part 1, 1952) as Leggatt ("The Secret Sharer")
 The Black Castle (1952) as Count Ernst von Melcher
 Target Hong Kong (1953) as Dockery Pete Gresham
 Rogue's March (1953) as Crane
 The Desert Rats (1953) as Capt. Currie (uncredited)
 Julius Caesar (1953) as Flavius
 Scandal at Scourie (1953) as Rev. Williams
 The Maze (1953) as William
 Houdini (1953) as Dooley
 The Royal African Rifles (1953) as Cunningham
 All the Brothers Were Valiant (1953) as Varde, Second Mate
 Hondo (1953) as Vittoro - Chiricahua Apache Chief
 El Alamein (1953) as Sgt. McQueen
 Secret of the Incas (1954) as Pachacutec
 King Richard and the Crusaders (1954) as Conrad, Marquis of Montferrat
 The Silver Chalice (1954) as Aaron Ben Joseph
 A Lawless Street (1955) as Harley Baskam
 The Court Jester (1955) as Sir Locksley
 The Killer is Loose (1956) as Detective Chris Gillespie
 The Revolt of Mamie Stover (1956) as Harry Adkins
 Congo Crossing (1956) as Bart O'Connell
 Reprisal! (1956) as Bert Shipley
 7th Cavalry (1956) as Capt. Benteen
 Something of Value (1957) as A Farmer - Joe Matson
 The Oklahoman (1957) as Charlie Smith
 The Tall Stranger (1957) as Charley
 Desert Hell (1958) as Ahitagel
 Hong Kong Confidential (1958) as John Blanchard
 Westbound (1959) as Mace
 Green Mansions (1959) as Priest
 Curse of the Undead (1959) as Drake Robey / Don Drago Robles
 Walk Like a Dragon (1960) as Rev. Will Allen
 The Canadians (1961) as Chief Four Horns (uncredited)
 Sergeants Three (1962) as Watanka
 Beauty and the Beast (1962) as Bruno
 Tower of London (1962) as Sir Ratcliffe
 California (1963) as Don Francisco Hernandez
 Drums of Africa (1963) as Viledo
 PT 109 (1963) as Lt. Reginald Evans
 McLintock! (1963) as Puma
 Advance to the Rear (1964) as Thin Elk
 Major Dundee (1965) as Sierra Charriba
 Brainstorm (1965) as Dr. Mills
 The Great Sioux Massacre (1965) as Sitting Bull
 The Singing Nun (1966) as Mr. Arlien
 Return of the Gunfighter (1967) as Frank Boone
 Little Jungle Boy (1971) as The Sultan
 Mad Dog Morgan (1976) as Superintendent Winch
 Tim (1981) (also screenplay, director, producer)
 The Battle of Broken Hill (1981) as Himself - Narrator
 The Mango Tree (1982) (writer, producer only)
 Duet for Four (1982) as Al Geisman
 The Return of Captain Invincible (1983) as President
 The Wild Duck (1984) as Wardle
 The Camel Boy (1984) (voice)
 The Adventures of Tom Sawyer (1986) as Injun Joe (voice)
 Death of a Soldier (1986) as Maj. Gen. Sutherland
 The Howling III (1987) as President
 A Dangerous Life (1988) as Stephen W. Bosworth

Television

 The Lone Wolf (1954) as Suva Polege/Dr. Bill Roche
  You Are There (1953/1955) as Brutus
 Schlitz Playhouse (1954/1955)
 Four Star Playhouse (1955) as Sgt. Gibbons
 Passport to Danger (1956)
 Conflict (1956)
 Broken Arrow (1956) as Gokliya
 Soldiers of Fortune (1956) as Salom
 Wire Service (1957) as Edward Lansing
 The Millionaire (1957) as Mark Jason
 The Adventures of McGraw (1957) as Blake
 Gunsmoke (1957) as Locke
 The O. Henry Playhouse (1957)
 The Adventures of Jim Bowie (1957) as First Officer
 Goodyear Theatre (1957) as Jim Witcher
 The Californians (1958) as Don Manuel Guzman
 Zorro (1958) as Salvador Quintana
 The Frank Sinatra Show (1958) as Paul Dupres
 Climax! (1954/1958) as Wilcher/Eddie/Bert Landon
 The Silent Service (1958) as Australian Commando Dennis
 Sugarfoot (1958) as Ross Garrett
 The Adventures of Rin Tin Tin (1959) as Sleeping Dog
 The Third Man as Nick Boles
 Black Saddle as Garnie Starrit
 Wanted: Dead or Alive as Victorio/Captain Manuel Herrera
 Markham (1959) as Largo
 Westinghouse Desilu Playhouse (1959) as Howard
 Gunsmoke (1959) as Indian’s Wild Hog & Blue Horse (latter the title character)
 Grand Jury (1959) as Freeman
 The Detectives (1960) as Lyman
 Law of the Plainsman (1960) as 'Gentleman' Frank Deegan
 The Texan (1958/1960) as George Brandon/Emory
 Wichita Town (1960) as Kotana
 Men Into Space (1960) as Dr. Morrow
 The Islanders (1960) as Moribus
 Zane Grey Theater (1956-1960) as Gunman/Deputy Charlie Spawn/Miguel/Geronimo
 Michael Shayne  (1960) as Leo Gannet
 Hawaiian Eye  (1960) as Joe Gordon
 General Electric Theater (1961) as Dick Rogers
 Adventures in Paradise (1961) as Andre Villard
 Maverick (1961) as Chet Whitehead
 Thriller (1961) as Shanner
 The Tall Man (1961) as Harry Young
 The Roaring 20's (1961) as Frankie Delain
 Acapulco (1961) as George Jamison
 Peter Gunn (1961) as Juan Mendoza
 Follow the Sun (1961) as T.J. Conlon
 Lawman (1961) as King Harris
 Frontier Circus (1961) as Michael Smith
 Tales of Wells Fargo (1960-1961) as Hogan/Paul Jennings Kalo
 Laramie (1960-1962) as Governor Loren Corteen/Quinto/Toriano
 Have Gun - Will Travel (1957-1962) as Miguel Rojas/Chief Tamasun (twice)
 77 Sunset Strip (1962) as Reggie Waddick/Nicky Madrid-Andrew Cornell
 The Rifleman (1958-1962) as Xavier Escobar/Brad Davis/Pete Morgan/Mogollan/Sanchez
 Route 66 (1962) as Phillip Tager
 The Beachcomber (1962) as Ricardo Selas
 Cheyenne (1957-1962) as Strongbow/Col. Rissot/Chato
 Ripcord (1962) 
 Rawhide (1959-1964) as Taslatch/Mitla/Sankeno/Richard Goffage/Running Horse
 Glynis (1963) as Wellman
 The Dakotas (1963) as Hal Regis
 Perry Mason (1963-1964) as Richard Harris/Jack Mallory
 Temple Houston (1964) as Nat Cramer
 Gunsmoke (1957-1964) as Locke/Wild Hog/Blue Horse/Buffalo Calf
 Profiles in Courage (1965) as John Wilson
 Lassie (1965) as Eddie Burch
 The Alfred Hitchcock Hour (1964-1965) as Hare/Stephen Leslie
 Kraft Suspense Theatre (1965) as Johnny Slato
 Wagon Train (1958-1965) as Yellow Robe/Crazy Bear
 Burke's Law (1965) as Kauffman
 Get Smart (1965) as Naharana
 The Man From U.N.C.L.E. (1966) as Lucienne Bey
 Honey West (1966) as Darza
 Branded (1966) as Chief Crazy Horse
 Daktari (1966) as Patrick Boyle Connors
 Daniel Boone (1964-1966) as Pushta/Raaccuwan
 Batman (1966) as Second Hand Three
 The Wild Wild West (1966) as Bledsoe
 Death Valley Days (1962-1966) as Roy Anthony/Two Horses/Augustine Chacon/Chief Hastele/Frenchy Godey/Horace Stoner
 The Magical World of Disney (1967) as Capt. Blazer
 The Time Tunnel (1966-1967) as Capt. Hotchkiss/Captain
 Rango (1967) as Burning Arrow
  The Road West (1967) as Deacon
 The Rat Patrol (1967) as Sheik
 Tarzan (1967) as Griggs/Findley
 Mission: Impossible (1967) as General Diaz
 Hondo  (1967) as Chief Vittoro
 Maya (1968) as Matt Collins
 Voyage to the Bottom of the Sea (1964-1968) as Colonel/Hamid/Gelid
  Riptide (1969) as Wes Lowry/Capt. Bonner
 The Virginian (1963-1970) as Mike McGoff/Alf
 Homicide (1970) as Harold Barrett
 Delta (1970) as Leo Falstone-Green
 The Long Arm (1970) as David Martin
 Division 4 (1970) as Vic Delaney
 The Box (1974) as Narrator
 Matlock Police (1971-1975) as Det. Sgt. Vic Maddern
 Cash and Company (1975) as Jacob Striker
  Power Without Glory (1976) as Dr. Malone/Archbishop Malone
 Mission: Impossible'' (1989) as Luis Berezan

References

External links
Michael Pate Memorial

Michael Pate at the National Film and Sound Archive
Michael Pate at FelixLeiter.com
Michael Pate dies at 88
Obituary in The Times

1920 births
2008 deaths
Australian male television actors
Australian male film actors
Deaths from pneumonia in New South Wales
Australian Army soldiers
Australian Army personnel of World War II
Australian screenwriters
Male actors from Sydney
Writers from Sydney
Western (genre) television actors
20th-century Australian screenwriters
Australian expatriates in the United States